Tom Lee Music is a musical retail company, Tom Lee Music Hong Kong was founded in 1953 by Thomas T.V. Lee. Tom Lee Music Canada was founded in 1969 and operate independently from the Asia operation. The Canadian head office is located in Vancouver. Tom Lee Music Hong Kong has 15 stores in Hong Kong and 1 in Macau. The thirty thousand square feet flagship store in Tsim Sha Tsui is one of largest musical instruments and accessories retailers in South East Asia, offering the most extensive range of product including pianos, guitars, amplifiers, percussion, electronic keyboards, music publications, professional and personal audio products. Tom Lee Music also offers the Yamaha Music Program. In 1960, Tom Lee Music became the exclusive distributor of Yamaha musical instruments and audio equipment in Hong Kong. The Canadian operation operates 12 locations across Canada under the Tom Lee Music and Steinway Piano Gallery names.

Tom Lee Engineering Ltd. is a wholly owned subsidiary of Tom Lee Music.

Operations 

Apart from musical instruments and music publications for classical music and pop music, Tom Lee Music also sells professional recording equipment.

Instrument repair and maintenance service 

Tom Lee Music in Hong Kong offers repair and maintenance services for various musical instruments including and audio products.  Their service received ISO 9001:2008 QMS certificate in 2009.

Facility rentals

Olympian City 
Tom Lee Music Studio is located at Olympian City Tom Lee Music Academy. It is a recording venue for any music genre, regularly used by solo artists and bands. It can accommodate 7- 10 persons, which is an ideal venue for rehearsals and recording.

Area:  around 310 sq ft

Capacity: 7-10 pax

Facilities: High quality studio effects and instruments, professional recording system and digital audio recording facility

Address : Shop G02, Olympian City 3, 1 Hoi Wang Road, Kowloon

Tin Hau 
Tom Lee Music Theatre (Tin Hau) is located at Tin Hau Music Academy, 5 minutes’ walk from Tin Hau MTR station. It can accommodate 30 persons, which is an ideal venue for conferences, seminars, meetings or training days.

Area: around 500 sq ft.

Capacity: Seated 30

Facilities: Grand Piano and Basic Sound System

Address : 13/F, Park Commercial Centre, 180 Tung Lo Wan Road, Hong Kong

Music education 

Tom Lee Music Foundation was formed in 1977 (non-profit-making) to promote music through education and events for general public.  They run various classical, pop music and group lessons such as the Yamaha Music Program.

Music events 

In Hong Kong, Tom Lee Music run annual music events including Yamaha Asian Beat Band Competition and Soundbase acoustic band competition, “Tom Lee Music Plaza”  at Tsim Sha Tsui waterfront and various piano competitions and music instruments workshops.

Canada 
Tom Lee Music Canada was incorporated in 1969. Its main showroom is located on Granville Street, in Downtown Vancouver. The company operates eight Tom Lee Music locations throughout British Columbia, and four stores under the Steinway Piano Gallery name in Markham, Mississauga, Ottawa, and Calgary.

See also 
 List of Hong Kong companies

References

External links
Tom Lee Music Store Tom Lee Music Store Official Site (2022)
Thomas Lee NAMM Oral History Interview (2011)
Betty Lee NAMM Oral History Interview (2011)
John K.C. Lee NAMM Oral History Interview (2011)
Frank Lee NAMM Oral History Interview (2011)
Kenny Lee NAMM Oral History Interview (2011)
Henry Lee NAMM Oral History Interview (2011)
Katie Yu NAMM Oral History Interview (2011)

Music retailers of Canada
Retail companies of Hong Kong
Entertainment companies established in 1953
Retail companies established in 1953
Musical instrument retailers of Canada